Snively Farm is a historic home and farm located near Eakles Mills, Washington County, Maryland, United States. It is a two-story, three-bay 18th century log structure with an exposed basement at the front elevation on fieldstone foundations.  The home features a two-story, three-bay rear addition built in the late 18th or early 19th century with a one-story, two-bay stone kitchen.  The property includes a stone springhouse and a frame butchering or outkitchen with a massive stone exterior chimney.

The Snively Farm was listed on the National Register of Historic Places in 1979.

References

External links
, including photo from 1997, at Maryland Historical Trust

Farms on the National Register of Historic Places in Maryland
Houses in Washington County, Maryland
National Register of Historic Places in Washington County, Maryland